George of Bytom (b. 1300 - d. by 1327), was a Duke of Bytom since 1316 until his death (as co-ruler of his brother).

He was the fourth son of Duke Casimir of Bytom by his wife Helena.

Life
There is little information about George's life. After his father's death in 1312, he remain at the side of his elder brother Władysław, formally as his co-ruler. On 19 February 1327 in Opawa, George and his brothers Władysław and Siemowit paid homage to the Bohemian King John of Luxembourg. This is the last message about George as a living person; probably he died shortly after that date. He never married or had children, and the place of his burial is unknown.

 
 
 

1300 births
1320s deaths
Piast dynasty